Lee Gyu-chang (born 21 May 1979) is a South Korean freestyle swimmer. He competed in two events at the 1996 Summer Olympics.

References

External links
 

1979 births
Living people
South Korean male freestyle swimmers
Olympic swimmers of South Korea
Swimmers at the 1996 Summer Olympics
Place of birth missing (living people)
Swimmers at the 1998 Asian Games
Asian Games competitors for South Korea
20th-century South Korean people